The Gran Premio Bruno Beghelli (also known as GP Beghelli) is a late season men's road bicycle race held annually in Monteveglio, near the city of Bologna, Italy. From 2005 to 2013, the race has been organised as a 1.1 event on the UCI Europe Tour, while in 2014 it was upgraded to 1.HC. It was first held in 1996, after the disappearance of the Milano–Vignola.

A women's race, the Gran Premio Bruno Beghelli Internazionale Donne Elite, has been held since 2016.

Winners

References

External links
 

 
UCI Europe Tour races
Cycle races in Italy
Recurring sporting events established in 1997
1997 establishments in Italy